Girl Scout Cookies are cookies sold by Girl Scouts to raise funds to support Girl Scout councils and individual troops. 

Girl Scout Cookies may also refer to:
Girl Scout Cookies (cannabis strain)
"Girl Scout Cookies", a song by Ted Nugent from Love Grenade
"Girl Scout Cookies", a single by Blaze Foley